Robert Bullock (December 8, 1828 – July 27, 1905) was an American state legislator and a United States representative from Florida. He was a brigadier general in the Confederate States Army during the American Civil War.

Early life and career
He was born in Greenville, North Carolina where he attended the common schools.

He moved to Fort King, Florida in 1844 which was then a United States Government post, near the present city of Ocala, Florida. He taught in the first school in Sumter County, Florida.

Seminole Uprising

Bullock was commissioned by the Governor of Florida in 1856 as a captain to raise a mounted company of volunteers for the suppression of the Seminole uprising. The company was mustered into the service of the United States and served eighteen months, until the cessation of hostilities.

Civil War
Bullock entered the Confederate Army as captain in the 7th Florida Infantry in 1861 and served until the close of the War. He was promoted to lieutenant colonel in 1863 and to brigadier general in 1865 to date from November 29, 1864. Bullock took part in the Battle of Chickamauga, the Atlanta Campaign, and the Franklin-Nashville Campaign, where he was severely wounded.

Post-War career
After the war, Bullock studied law, was admitted to the bar in 1866, and began practice in Marion County. He served as judge of probate court 1866-1868 and was a member of the Florida House of Representatives in 1879. He was again clerk of the circuit court of Marion County from 1881 to 1889.

Congress
He was elected as a Democrat to the Fifty-first and Fifty-second Congresses (March 4, 1889 – March 3, 1893). Bullock was not a candidate for renomination in 1892. After leaving Congress, he engaged in agricultural pursuits. He was elected judge of Marion County in 1903 and served until his death in Ocala, Florida in 1905.

He was buried in Evergreen Cemetery.

See also

 List of American Civil War generals (Confederate)

References
 Eicher, John H., and David J. Eicher, Civil War High Commands. Stanford: Stanford University Press, 2001. .
 Warner, Ezra J. Generals in Gray: Lives of the Confederate Commanders. Baton Rouge: Louisiana State University Press, 1959. .
 Retrieved on 2008-10-18

1828 births
1905 deaths
People from Greenville, North Carolina
Democratic Party members of the United States House of Representatives from Florida
Democratic Party members of the Florida House of Representatives
Confederate States Army brigadier generals
People of Florida in the American Civil War
People of North Carolina in the American Civil War
People from Marion County, Florida
19th-century American politicians